Rebel Girls is a digital media company and children's book publisher founded by Elena Favilli, co-author of the Good Night Stories for Rebel Girls series. The company produces content that focuses on the biographies of women from all over the world, and throughout history.

Literary works

Good Night Stories for Rebel Girls Volume 1
Good Night Stories for Rebel Girls Volume 2
 I am a Rebel Girl: A Journal to start revolutions
Madam C.J. Walker Builds a Business
Ada Lovelace Cracks the Code
Junko Tabei Masters the Mountains
Wangari Maathai Plants a Forest 
  Alicia Alonso Takes the Stage

In October 2020, Rebel Girls will publish the third installment in its original series, Good Night Stories for Rebel Girls: 100 Immigrant Women Who Changed the World, authored by Elena Favilli.

Podcast

Rebel Girls produces a podcast, Good Night Stories for Rebel Girls: The Podcast. Every episode features the story of a woman from Good Night Stories for Rebel Girls, narrated by notable women like Melinda Gates, Priscilla Chan, Jameela Jamil, and Tarana Burke.

Awards

2019 People's Choice Podcast Awards, Number One in Education 
2020 Corporate Content Awards, Bronze, Best Use of Content in a Social Context

References

2016 establishments in California
Digital mass media companies
Children's book publishers